George Smith (February 2, 1809 - July 14, 1881) was an American politician who was active in Ohio and Missouri. He was most notable for his service as Lieutenant governor of Missouri from 1865 to 1869, and United States Marshal for the Western District of Missouri from 1869 to 1877.

Early life
George Smith was born in Columbiana County, Ohio on February 2, 1809, the son of John and Mary (Fisher) Smith. Both of Smith's grandfathers were natives of Pennsylvania and veterans of the American Revolution, and his father was a veteran of the War of 1812.

Smith was educated in Columbiana County and attended Miami University in Oxford, Ohio, but left before graduating so he could begin a business and farming career. His early ventures included transporting flour by boat to New Orleans in the winter, and driving cattle from Ohio to eastern Pennsylvania and Maryland in the summer. Smith was also active in the state militia, and was appointed commander of the 1st Company of the 1st Regiment with the rank of captain.

Start of career
In 1835, Smith moved to East Liverpool, Ohio, where he established a successful business as a merchant and freight forwarder. A Democrat, from 1837 to 1839 he represented Columbiana County in the Ohio House of Representatives. During his legislative service, Smith was appointed chairman of the House Committee on Banks and Corporations.

Move to Missouri
In 1832, Smith stopped in St. Louis, where he purchased a horse and began a trip to explore the western part of Missouri. In 1844, Smith moved to Caldwell County, Missouri, where he resided for the next 24 years. He transported a flock of sheep from his Ohio home to his new home in Missouri, and became one of the first major wool growers in the state.

In 1852, Smith was elected to represent Caldwell County in the Missouri House of Representatives. He served in the session of 1853, and received credit for passage of the bill which created the Hannibal and St. Joseph Railroad and the Pacific Railroad. During the Bleeding Kansas crisis of the mid to late 1850s, Smith opposed the efforts of the pro-slavery side and declared himself in favor of maintaining the Union.

Civil War
At the start of the American Civil War, Smith declared himself an Unconditional Unionist and an abolitionist. Among his pro-Union activities was the organization of a militia unit in Caldwell County, one of the first organized outside St. Louis. In 1862, he was again elected to the Missouri House of Representatives, where the Republican Caucus appointed him to the committee which drafted the call for a convention of pro-Union Missourians. The convention enacted several measures, including the abolition of slavery and the restriction of voting rights to Unionists who opposed the Confederacy.

In 1864, Smith was president of the state Republican convention, which was held in Jefferson City. The convention delegates nominated Smith for lieutenant governor. He was elected by a substantial majority, and served from January 2, 1865 to January 12, 1869. As lieutenant governor, Smith presided over the Missouri Senate, and was praised by members of the Republican and Democratic parties for his tact and fairness. In addition, he served as president of the state board of equalization, which heard appeals and made adjustments of real estate and personal property tax assessments.

Later life
In 1868, Smith moved to Cameron, Missouri. In March 1869, he was appointed United States Marshal for the Western District of Missouri. He served until March 1877, when he declined reappointment and retired. In retirement, Smith was active in Cameron's Presbyterian church, of which he was ruling elder for several years.

Smith died in Cameron on July 14, 1881. He was buried at Packard Cemetery in Cameron.

Family
In 1833, Smith married Sarah A. Chapman of Brooke County, West Virginia. They were the parents of a son and a daughter. Sarah Chapman Smith died in 1836, and in 1839 Smith married Mary A. Kerrins. With his second wife, Smith was the father of three sons and two daughters.

References

External links

|-

1809 births
1881 deaths
People from East Liverpool, Ohio
People from Cameron, Missouri
Members of the Ohio House of Representatives
Members of the Missouri House of Representatives
Lieutenant Governors of Missouri
Ohio Democrats
Missouri Democrats
Missouri Unconditional Unionists
Missouri Republicans
People of Missouri in the American Civil War
19th-century American politicians
Burials in Missouri